Bruce Atherton Smith (1937 – November 27, 2006) was a journalist and politician in the province of New Brunswick, Canada.

In 1959, Smith graduated from Radio and Television Arts program at the Ryerson Institute of Technology in Toronto, Ontario. He moved to New Brunswick where he worked as a radio broadcaster and was News Director and General Manager of radio station CJCJ in the town of  Woodstock.

Smith entered provincial politics as a Liberal candidate and was elected to the Legislative Assembly of New Brunswick in the 1987, 1991 and 1995.  He did not seek re-election in 1999.

He served in the cabinet first as Minister of Supply and Services from 1987 to 1991 and then as Solicitor General of New Brunswick from 1991 to 1994 when he was removed in a cabinet shuffle.  After the 1995 election, he returned to his previous Supply & Services post until 1997 when he was again removed from cabinet during a shuffle.

Smith died in 2006 due to complications from diabetes.

Sources
Premier's message on death of Bruce Smith
CBC riding profile

1937 births
2006 deaths
Toronto Metropolitan University alumni
Canadian radio journalists
New Brunswick Liberal Association MLAs
Members of the Executive Council of New Brunswick
People from Carleton County, New Brunswick